Pentafluorobenzene is an organofluoride compound with the molecular formula . The compound consists of a benzene ring substituted with five fluorine atoms. The substance is a colorless liquid with a boiling point similar to that of benzene.   It is prepared by defluorination of highly fluorinated cyclohexanes over hot nickel or iron. Another method involved dehydrofluorination of polyfluorinated cyclohexane using hot aqueous solution of KOH.

See also
Hexafluorobenzene
Pentachlorobenzene
Fluorobenzene

References

Fluoroarenes